North Madison may refer to:

North Madison, Indiana
North Madison, Ohio